The Immaculate Conception Church is a historic church and former cathedral at 115 N. Cushman Street in Fairbanks, Alaska, United States.

Built in 1904, it was the first Roman Catholic Church erected in Alaska's interior. The church was originally located on Dunkel Street, but in the winter of 1911–12, the church was moved across the Chena River to its present location so that it would be closer to St. Joseph's Hospital, which closed in the 1960s.  After the move, the basement of rough frame structure was enlarged to provide a parish hall, it was wired for electricity, and a parish house was built adjacent.  The steeple and vestibule were added in 1914, the roof was raised, and the choir gallery added.  Its stained glass windows were added in 1926–28.

The church was listed on the National Register of Historic Places in 1976.

See also
List of Catholic cathedrals in the United States
List of cathedrals in the United States
National Register of Historic Places listings in Fairbanks North Star Borough, Alaska

References

1904 establishments in Alaska
Buildings and structures in Fairbanks, Alaska
Relocated buildings and structures in Alaska
Roman Catholic cathedrals in Alaska
Churches on the National Register of Historic Places in Alaska
Former cathedrals in the United States
Buildings and structures on the National Register of Historic Places in Fairbanks North Star Borough, Alaska
Roman Catholic churches completed in 1904
Roman Catholic churches in Alaska
Roman Catholic Diocese of Fairbanks
20th-century Roman Catholic church buildings in the United States